Discoverer 20, also known as KH-5 9014A, was a USAF photographic reconnaissance satellite under the supervision of the National Reconnaissance Office (NRO) which was launched in 1961. Discoverer 20 was the first KH-5 ARGON satellite to be launched.

Launch

The launch of Discoverer 20 occurred at 20:24:00 GMT on 17 February 1961. A Thor DM-21 Agena-B rocket was used, flying from launch pad 75-3-4 at the Vandenberg Air Force Base. Upon successfully reaching orbit, it was assigned the Harvard designation 1961 Epsilon 1. Images were recorded onto  film, and were to have been returned in a Satellite Recovery Vehicle (SRV) before the satellite ceased operations.

Mission

Discoverer 20 was placed in a near-polar orbit to continue evaluation of the Agena-B system, with particular emphasis on the spacecraft's stabilization system in order to overcome instability problems encountered on the previous DISCOVERER and to attempt ejection, deceleration, reentry through the atmosphere, and recovery of an instrument package. The satellite's scientific experiment package of radiation dosimeters, infrared radiometers, and microwave band detectors was identical to that of Discoverer 18 (launched 7 December 1960). Also included were the necessary telemetry and a  reentry capsule. The recovery capsule payload included photographic film packs, nuclear track plates, and biological specimens. In addition to the external lights for optical tracking, the satellite carried a precision tracking experiment. The total package weighed 1,110 kg (2,450 lb). Recovery of the capsule was not attempted due to a system malfunction, and thus the scientific experiment data obtained were limited. Discoverer 20 decayed from orbit on 28 July 1962.

References

Spacecraft launched in 1961
Spacecraft which reentered in 1962